Bezvan (also Romanized as Bezvān, Bozvān, and Bazovān; also known as Beyzehvān, Bezāvān, and Buzavan) is a village in Bedevostan-e Sharqi Rural District, in the Central District of Heris County, East Azerbaijan Province, Iran. At the 2006 census, its population was 248, in 49 families.

References 

Populated places in Heris County